Malaysia competed at the 2015 World Aquatics Championships in Kazan, Russia from 24 July to 9 August 2015.

Medalists

Diving

Malaysian divers qualified for the individual spots and the synchronized teams at the World Championships.

Men

Women

Mixed

Open water swimming

Malaysia has qualified one swimmer to compete in the open water marathon.

Swimming

Malaysian swimmers have achieved qualifying standards in the following events (up to a maximum of 2 swimmers in each event at the A-standard entry time, and 1 at the B-standard):

Men

Women

Synchronized swimming

Malaysia has qualified one synchronized swimmer in the women's solo events.

References

External links
Malaysia Swimming

Nations at the 2015 World Aquatics Championships
2015 in Malaysian sport
Malaysia at the World Aquatics Championships